Jeziorak Iława is a Polish football club based in Iława, Poland. It was founded in 1945. The team's official colors are white and blue. Jeziorak played in the second division for five years and spent multiple seasons at the third level of Polish association football.

Achievements
 5 seasons at the second tier of Polish association football - including a 4th place in 1995/96,
 Reaching the quarter-finals of the Polish Cup - 1995.

History
The club was established in 1945, the exact date being arbitrary. Initially, it was called Warmia. In May 1946, the football team played their first match against Drwęca Nowe Miasto Lubawskie. In 1947, the club's name was changed to Kolejarz. Ten years later, the current name, Jeziorak was adopted.

In 2014, a new association, initially called ITR and later renamed to ITS Jeziorak, which continues the traditions of the club established in 1945, was founded.

League history
In 1956, the football team was promoted to the third division for the first time and played at this level for three consecutive seasons. From the 1960s until the 1980s, the club oscillated between the third and fifth league level.

In 1988, the team was promoted to the third division. It marked the start of the most successful period in the club's history. From 1989 onwards, Jeziorak's results in the third division improved with each passing season. In 1995, the team finished second at the third level. However, FC Piaseczno, then a second division club, gave up its place at that level for financial reasons. The Warsaw Regional Football Association suggested that a playoff match between the fifteenth team of the second division, Radomiak Radom, and the runner-up at the third level, Jeziorak Iława, was held to decide which team gets the second-tier spot. Having been approved by the central authorities, the match was held on 30 July 1995 in Warsaw. Jeziorak won 5–1 and gained promotion to the second division (II liga).

During the 1995/96 season, right after having been promoted, Jeziorak was the leader of II liga at the halfway stage. Ultimately, the club finished fourth out of 18 teams in the eastern group of the second division. This has been the best result in the club's entire history so far. The following season, Jeziorak was ranked eight, and one year later - seventh. In 1998/99, the season when the number of teams participating in both second division groups was reduced from 18 to 16, Jeziorak finished ninth, avoiding relegation by just one point. In 1999/00, the two groups of the second division were merged to create a single II liga that numbered 24 teams. Jeziorak only managed to finish 20th, as a result of which, the club was relegated to the third division.

In 2000/01, the club finished 17th out of 20 teams in the third division and was relegated once again. Mounting debt is given as one of the reasons for this failure. Jeziorak spent the following four seasons at the fourth level. While the club managed to win promotion back to the third level in 2005, the team finished 12th out of 15 teams and returned to the fourth division the following year where it stayed for the next two seasons.

After the 2007/08 season, the league system in Poland was reformed. Jeziorak, having won its group of the fourth division, participated in playoffs against Unia Tarnów winning in a penalty shootout and gaining promotion to the new II liga. Jeziorak played at the third level for the following four seasons. However, continuous financial problems resulted in the team being relegated and then, withdrawing from participating at the fourth level in 2012. Jeziorak spent the following two seasons (2012/13 and 2013/14) in the klasa okręgowa, the sixth level of association football in Poland.

In 2014, the team started anew by joining the klasa B which is the eight division - the lowest level of association football in the region. While the team only managed to finish fourth in 2014/15, from the following season onwards, Jeziorak has been steadily climbing the league ladder, winning the klasa B in 2016, the klasa A in 2017, and the klasa okręgowa in 2018.

In the Polish Cup
The club's most notable result at the central level of the Polish Cup was achieved during the 1994/95 season. In the fall of 1994, before being promoted to the second division, Jeziorak won against Polonia Chodzież (third division at the time) in a penalty shootout in the first round, proceeding to win against Stomil Olsztyn (recently promoted to the top tier of Polish association football) in a penalty shootout in the second round. Both matches ended in 0–0 draws. In the third round, Jeziorak won against Elana Toruń (third division) 4–1 after extra time. In the fourth round, Jeziorak decisively won against the top-tier team, Górnik Zabrze, 3–1. Jeziorak proceeded to eliminate Amica Wronki (second division) 1–0 in the fifth round. The club reached the quarterfinals of the cup being eliminated by Lech Poznań, another top-tier club, the following spring.

Jeziorak managed to reach the 16th-finals or round of 32 on other occasions by eliminating lower-tier teams. This took place in 1997, 2000, 2006  and 2007.

Current squad 
As of 31 May 2018

Notes

References

External links 
 

Iława County
Football clubs in Warmian-Masurian Voivodeship
Association football clubs established in 1945
1945 establishments in Poland